Gildardo Gutierrez Mendez (born in Guadalajara March 15, 1982) is a Mexican business activist and entrepreneur. He served as Secretary of Economic Development in the city of Querétaro, where more than 19,000 million pesos were invested in 2016. This made Querétaro the main destination for national and global investment within Mexico. Furthermore, he serves as Counselor of different foundations and educational institutions in Mexico and the United States. He has actively promoted international agreements on education and foreign direct investment in Mexico.

Career 
Founder of a series of companies, he serves on the Board of Directors of several of them. He is Founding President of the Association of Mexican Entrepreneurs (AEM) in Washington D.C.. He has encouraged the change of the narrative of Mexico in the United States, centering on the “construction of bridges” between the two countries. This has been done through collaboration with both public and private sectors.

Gutierrez is the author of FuturoEducativoDistritos (2013) (Educational Future: School Districts) and Open to the Parents of the Family (2014), which are based on the fundamentals of the need for decentralization of education in Mexico, the implementation of school districts, and the institutional role of parents in the family. Districts and Open have been presented in various academic institutions and “Think-tanks” in Mexico and the United States, including Brookings Institution. Gildardo is also the author of research papers that include the Education Series, used by the Institution of Mexico, of the Woodrow Wilson Center for International Academics. In 2016 he published the book, Central Corridor, that discusses the global agenda of global investment in Mexico, which is the subject of the Central Corridor law initiative (2017). 

La Alianza Centro-Bajío que en 2019 han suscrito los Estados de Querétaro, Jalisco, San Luis Potosí, Guanajuato y Aguascalientes. It is based on the initiative of the Central Corridor and seeks to position Mexico as a destination of global investment.  

Along with the initiative of the Districts law, it was presented by 18 congressmen and one citizen on November 6th, 2014. In an unprecedented act, Gildardo Gutiérrez became one of the first Mexican citizens to rise to the platform in the Chamber of Congress, and as a private citizen, personally present a law initiative. 

He is an active citizen in the business, social, and public policy sectors. In his pastime he enjoys reading, singing, road biking, and horses.

Education 

2014 Georgetown University
Masters in Public Policy Administration, McCourt School of Public Policy

2011 Harvard Law School
Negotiation Program for Senior Management

2011 Massachusetts Institute of Technology
Development of Leadership Strategies in Operations Program

2008 China Europe International Business School
Strategy Development and Competitive Advantages Program 

2007 Harvard Business School
Private Capital and Investments Program 

2007 Harvard School of Education
“The Education of the Next Decade: Charter Schools” Program 

2006 Harvard Business School
Excellence in the Government of Non-governmental Organizations Program

2000–2006 Instituto Tecnológico de Estudios Superiores de Monterrey
Masters in Business Administration

External links
Corredor Central del Bajío creará nueva ruta industrial a Querétaro: Gildardo Gutiérrez https://codiceinformativo.com/2015/11/corredor-central-del-bajio-creara-nueva-ruta-industrial-a-queretaro-gildardo-gutierrez/

Se presenta en Querétaro el libro Corredor Central: https://www.imagenradio.com.mx/rodrigo-pacheco/gobierno-de-queretaro-presenta-libro-corredor-central-para-impulsar-inversiones

Presentan Corredor Central,
https://www.eleconomista.com.mx/estados/Presentan-Corredor-Central-20161025-0064.html

Avanza la Creación del Corredor Central: http://www.eluniversalqueretaro.mx/metropoli/01-08-2016/avanza-conformacion-de-corredor-central

Corredor Central en Austin, Texas http://periodicolafuente.com/gutierrez-mendez-atrae-inversiones-para-el-municipio-durante-gira-por-austin-texas/

En marzo el convenio para creación del Corredor Central del Bajío
http://www.andresestevez.mx/magazine/noticias/item/4705-en-marzo-el-convenio-para-creacion-del-corredor-central-del-bajio-dicen

1982 births
Living people
Mexican businesspeople
Mexican company founders
People from Guadalajara, Jalisco